Guido is a North American subculture, slang term, and ethnic slur referring to working-class urban Italian-Americans.  The guido stereotype is multi-faceted. Originally, the term was used as a demeaning term for Italian-Americans in general.  More recently, it has come to refer to working-class urban Italian-Americans who conduct themselves in an overtly macho manner or belong to a particular working-class urban Italian-American subculture.  The time period in which it obtained the later meaning is not clear, but some sources date it to the 1970s or 1980s. The term is not used in Italy.

Etymology 
The word "guido" is derived from the Italian given name "Guido", originally the Italian version of the French given name Guy. Fishermen of Italian descent were often called "Guidos" in medieval times.

Contentious use 
 
The term is used in states and metropolitan areas associated with large Italian-American populations, such as New York City, New Jersey, Connecticut, Buffalo, Chicago, Detroit, Ohio, Pittsburgh, Philadelphia, Boston, and Providence. In other areas, terms such as "Cugine" (Brooklyn), "Mario" (Chicago) and "Gino" (Toronto) have a meaning similar to guido. Although some Italians self-identify as "guidos", the term is often considered derogatory or an ethnic slur.

MTV caused controversy in 2009 when they used the term in promotions for the reality television show Jersey Shore. This spurred objections from Italian-American organizations such as Unico National, NIAF, the Order Sons of Italy in America, and the Internet watchdog organization ItalianAware. Although MTV removed the term from some promotions, it remains closely associated with the show, and some of the cast members use it regularly to describe themselves while the females sometimes refer to themselves as a "guidette."

According to author and professor Pellegrino D'Acierno, "guido" is a derogatory term for stereotypical working class or lower class Italian-American males, "a pejorative term applied to lower-class, [Italian-American], macho, gold-amulet-wearing, self-displaying neighborhood boys [...] [with a] penchant for cruising in hot cars [...] Guidette is their gum-chewing, big-haired, air-headed female counterpart." In regards to the "guido" stereotype and the depiction of working class Italian-American communities in American film, Peter Bondanella contends that: "Although some films view the working class as a potentially noble and dignified group, others see the working-class Italian American as a Guido or Guidette - part of a tasteless, uneducated […] group of characters with vulgar gold chains, big hair, and abrasive manners."

Style 
Clothing often associated with the "Guido" stereotype includes gold chains (often herringbone chains, figaro chains, cornicellos, or saints' medallions), pinky rings, oversized gold or silver crucifixes, rosaries worn as necklaces, working class clothing such as plain white T-shirts, muscle shirts or "guinea Ts", leather jackets, sweat or tracksuits, coppola caps or scally caps, unbuttoned dress shirts, Italian knit shirts, designer brand T-shirts such as Armani, and often typical Southern Italian "tamarro" or "truzzo" club dress. Slicked-back hair and pompadours, blowouts, tapers, quiffs, fades and heavily pomaded hair are also common stereotypes.

See also

 Ars (slang)
 Greaser (subculture)
 Guappo
 Jersey Shore (TV series)
 Kiss Me, Guido
 List of ethnic slurs
 List of ethnic slurs by ethnicity
 Related slurs:
 Dago
 Goombah
 Guinea
 Wop

References

Anti-Italian sentiment
Class-related slurs
Ethnic and racial stereotypes
Italian language in the United States
Italian-American culture
Italian-American history
Stereotypes of urban people
Stereotypes of white people
Pejorative terms for white people
Stereotypes of working-class men
Subcultures
English words